The Liaocheng–Handan–Changzhi high-speed railway is a planned high-speed railway line in China.

Route 
The line starts at Liaocheng West railway station and heads east. It crosses the Shijiazhuang–Wuhan high-speed railway at Handan. East–north and West–north chords are planned to connect the two lines south of Handan East railway station. The line ends at Changzhi East railway station on the Taiyuan–Jiaozuo high-speed railway.

Stations

References 

High-speed railway lines in China